Relations between France and Algeria span more than five centuries. This large amount of time has led to many changes within the nation of Algeria; subsequently, affecting the relations enormously. Through this time period, Algeria has gone through being part of the Ottoman Empire, being conquered and colonized by France, playing an important role in both world wars, and finally being its own nation. Over time, relations between the nations have suffered, as tension between Algerians and the French have increased.

Early history

The first contact that was had between the two nations began in 1526, when Algeria was part of the Ottoman Empire. Francis I of France and the Ottoman Emperor Suleiman the Magnificent had just agreed upon the Franco-Ottoman alliance, which initiated contact between France and the Barbary States of Northern Africa. These states were considered vassals for the Ottoman Empire; thus, were drawn into relations with France as a result of this alliance.

The Barbary slave trade and Barbary corsairs originating from Ottoman Algeria were a major problem throughout the centuries, leading to regular punitive expeditions by France (1661, 1665, 1682, 1683, 1688). French admiral Abraham Duquesne fought the Barbary corsairs in 1681 and bombarded Algiers between 1682 and 1683, to help Christian captives.

The French conquest of Algeria started after a rather peculiar event, in April 1827, when the Dey of Algiers  supposedly struck the French consul with a fly whisk. Three years following this event, France began the invasion of Algeria. Between these three years, France unsuccessfully tried a variety of tactics in order to establish control in the region. All of them proved futile leading to a decision in 1830 to invade the country. The Algerians were quick to surrender following the landing of the French army on July 5, 1830. The last dey of Algiers, Husayn, was forced into exile as part of the agreement. However, one important Ottoman Algerian leader held onto power for several more years, but in general was quick to succumb to the French presence in the region. Due to the fact that Constantinople was a considerable distance away from Algiers, France easily stopped Ottoman influence in the region, and instead, asserted their own power.

French settlement of Algeria

French rule of Algeria was established during the years of 1830–47, in which a groundwork was created in how the nation would be controlled. Before they officially became a colony of France, Algeria remained under largely military administration. The Algerians, excluding the French settlers, were subject to rule by military officers with detailed knowledge of local affairs and languages, but no interest in broader colonial matters. This meant that the officers often sided with the native Algerians instead of the French colonizers demands and the situation was actually better for the Algerians under a strict military rule than when the French began to exert their influence. As French occupation continued, French settlers began to colonize more of the region. While these actions caused alarm and tension between the natives and the settlers at first, the influence of French education and continued presence of European settlers eventually created a reluctant acceptance and allowed the French settlers to accumulate enough power to declare Algeria a French territory after the overthrow of the French monarchy and King Louis-Phillipe in 1848. The settlers, commonly called "Pieds- Noirs" or "Blackfeet", began to demand more acknowledgement of the French government and started enforcing French influence and forms of control over the Algerian precedents, even though they only made up ten percent of the population in Algeria. These changes were seen in the conversion of former Turkish provinces into departments based on a French model and the advancement of colonization with renewed progress and excitement. The overshadowing of Algerian government and customs by the French continued as responsibility for Algeria was transferred from Algiers to a minister in Paris. Through the next couple of years and Napoleon III's reign, the French settlement of Algeria teetered between the control of the native Algerians and the French through actions such as the mentioned transfer of responsibility and the fight for dominant forms of government and society. Eventually, the slow build of European control led to the securement of settler domination after the fall of Napoleon III and the rise of the Third Republic in France.

World War II

During World War II, North Africa was the battle ground for much of the European-based war. With the invasion of France by Germany in 1940, the Allied forces were quick to take control of the colonies once controlled by the French. The Anglo-American occupation of North Africa began the start of modern-day Algeria. During this time, the occupational forces (both the Allied and the Axis powers) began delivering messages and promises of a "new world for formerly subject[ed] peoples". Promises of emancipation excited the Algerian people, as they would finally be able to form a sovereign nation. In December 1942, Ferhat Abbas drafted an Algerian Manifesto, and presented it to both the Allied and French authorities. This manifesto wanted recognition of an Algeria that was sovereign, and free of colonization. As a response, in 1943, French citizenship was given as an option to many North Africans. This, however was not enough to satisfy Algerians and an uprising soon followed.

On 8 May 1945, during celebrations to mark the end of the World war, an unorganized rising occurred in Setif where 84 European settlers were killed. The French replied with brute force, suppressing the Algerian population, killing thousands upon thousands of Algerians. Opposition continued against the French, and the brute force used by the French as well continued. In total, estimates of the deaths range from 1,000 to 45,000 deaths, with many more wounded. Following the events of the past as the Setif Massacre, French rule was introduced again.

Algerian War

For more than a century France maintained colonial rule in Algerian territory. This allowed exceptions to republican law, including Sharia laws applied by Islamic customary courts to Muslim women which gave women certain rights to property and inheritance which they did not have under French law. Discontent among the Muslim Algerians grew after the World Wars, in which the Algerians sustained many casualties. Algerian nationalists began efforts aimed at furthering equality by listing complaints in the Manifesto of the Algerian People, which requested equal representation under the state and access to citizenship, but no equality for all citizens to preserve Islamic precepts. The French response was to grant citizenship to 60,000 "meritorious" Muslims.

During a reform effort in 1947, the French created a bicameral legislature with one house for the French citizens and another for the Muslims but made a European's vote equal seven times a Muslim's vote. Paramilitary groups such as the Front de Libération nationale (FLN) appeared, claiming an Arabo-Islamic brotherhood and state. This led to the outbreak of a war for independence, the Algerian War, in 1954.  From first armed operations of November 1954, 'Pieds-Noirs' civilians have always been targets for FLN, either by assassination, bombing bars and cinemas and mass massacres, torture and rapes in farms. At the onset of the war, the Pieds-noirs believed the French military would be able to overcome opposition. In May 1958 a demonstration for French Algeria, led by Pieds-Noirs but including many Muslims, occupied an Algerian government building. General Massu controlled the riot by forming a Committee of Public Safety demanding that his acquaintance Charles de Gaulle be named president of the French Fourth Republic, to prevent the "abandonment of Algeria".

This eventually led to the fall of the Republic. In response, the French Parliament voted 329 to 224 to place de Gaulle in power. Once de Gaulle assumed leadership, he attempted peace by visiting Algeria within three days of his appointment claiming "French Algeria!" but in September 1959 he planned a referendum for Algerian self-determination that passed overwhelmingly. Many French political and military leaders in Algeria viewed this as betrayal and formed the Organisation armée secrète (OAS) that had much support among 'Pieds-Noirs'.

This paramilitary group began attacking officials representing de Gaulle's authority, Muslims, and de Gaulle himself. The OAS was also accused of murders and bombings nullifying reconciliation opportunities between the communities, while 'Pieds-Noirs' themselves never believed such reconciliation possible as their community was targeted from the start.  The opposition culminated in 1961 during the Algiers putsch of 1961, led by retired generals. After this failure, on 18 March 1962, de Gaulle and the FLN signed a cease-fire agreement, the Évian accords, and held a referendum. In July, Algerians voted 5,975,581 to 16,534 to become independent from France. This was an occasion for a massacre of 'Pieds-Noirs' in Oran by a suburban Muslim population. European people were shot, molested and brought to Petit-Lac slaughterhouse where they were tortured and executed.

Modern times 

Despite ambiguous sentiment in Algeria concerning its former colonial power, France has maintained a historically favored position in Algerian foreign relations. Algeria experienced a high level of dependency on France in the first years after the revolution and a conflicting desire to be free of that dependency. The already established trade links, the lack of experienced Algerian government officials, and the military presence provided for in the Évian Accords ending the War of Independence ensured the continuance of French influence. France supplied much-needed financial assistance, a steady supply of essential imports, and technical personnel.

This benevolent relationship was altered in the early Boumediène years when the Algerian government assumed control of French-owned petroleum extraction and pipeline interests and nationalized industrial and energy enterprises. French military units were almost immediately pulled out. France, although apparently willing to maintain cooperative relations, was overlooked as Algeria, eager to exploit its new independence, looked to other trade partners. Shortly afterward, Algerian interest in resuming French-Algerian relations resurfaced. Talks between Boumediène and the French government confirmed both countries' interest in restoring diplomatic relations. In 1974, Algeria's President Boumediène stated "Relation between France and Algeria may be good or bad, but in no way can they be trivial.", depicting this relationship. France wanted to preserve its privileged position in the strategically and economically important Algerian nation, and Algeria hoped to receive needed technical and financial assistance. French intervention in the Western Sahara against the Polisario and its lack of Algerian oil purchases, leading to a trade imbalance in the late 1970s strained relations and defeated efforts toward bilateral rapprochement. In 1983 Benjedid was the first Algerian leader to be invited to France on an official tour, but relations did not greatly improve.

Despite strained political relations, economic ties with France, particularly those related to oil and gas, have persisted throughout independent Algerian history. Nationalized Algerian gas companies, in attempting to equalize natural gas export prices with those of its neighbors, alienated French buyers in the late 1970s and early 1980s, however. Later gas agreements resulted in a vast growth of bilateral trade into the billions of dollars. Further disputes over natural gas pricing in the late 1980s led to a drastic drop in French-Algerian imports and exports. The former fell more than 10 billion French francs, the latter 12 billion French francs between 1985 and 1987. A new price accord in 1989 resurrected cooperative ties. The new agreement provided substantial French financial assistance to correct trade imbalances and guaranteed French purchasing commitments and Algerian oil and gas prices. French support for Benjedid's government throughout the difficult period in 1988 when the government appeared especially precarious and subsequent support for economic and political liberalization in Algeria expedited improved French-Algerian relations. Finally, rapprochement with Morocco, a number of joint economic ventures between France and Algeria, and the establishment of the UMA relaxed some of the remaining tensions.

One source of steady agitation has been the issue of Algerian emigration to France. French policies toward Algerian immigrants have been inconsistent, and French popular sentiment has generally been unfavorable toward its Arab population. The French government has vacillated between sweeping commitments to "codevelopment," involving extensive social networks for emigrant Algerian laborers, and support of strict regulations concerning work and study permits, random searches for legal papers, and expeditious deportation without appeal in the event of irregularities. North African communities in France remain relatively isolated, and chronic problems persist for Algerians trying to obtain housing, education, and employment. A number of racially motivated incidents occur each year between North African emigrants and French police and citizens.

One area that highlights both the dependence of Algeria on France after the revolutionary years, as well as the dynamic of inconsistent French policies towards immigrants, is football.  Before the revolution, Algerians players who displayed footballing excellence were called up to the French national team and were able to represent France in major competitions such as the FIFA World Cup.  They were not allowed to represent Algeria in the FIFA World Cup since Algeria was not recognized as an independent country at the time.  However, following the revolution, Algeria lacked the resources and infrastructure to properly develop young Algerian players and levied this responsibility on France and used France as an incubator of some sort.  The upside of this dynamic was that Algerian players were able to gain essential football training and experience.  However, the cream of the crop of Algerian players as a result were funneled into the French national team.  France was quick to exercise the dual citizenship right of these Algerian players since they were of great value. Several Algerian players, including the legendary Zinedine Zidane, have brought much praise and glory to France and France has always been quick to highlight the French identity of these players as they excelled, while ignoring their Algerian heritage or highlighting it when they make mistakes.  The average Algerian players developed in France are then funneled to the Algerian national team, and with such a system, the Algerian soccer team has been systematically handicapped historically.

Equally problematic has been Algeria's handling of the emigrant issue. The government has provided substantial educational, economic, and cultural assistance to the emigrant community but has been less consistent in defending emigrant workers' rights in France, frequently subordinating its own workers' interests to strategic diplomatic concerns in maintaining favorable relations with France. The rise of Islamism in Algeria and the subsequent crackdown on the Islamists by the government have had serious implications for both countries: record numbers of Algerian Islamists have fled to France, where their cultural dissimilarity as Arab Islamists is alien to the country.

In the early 1990s, nearly 20 percent of all Algerian exports and imports were destined for or originated from France. More than 1 million Algerians resided in France and there were numerous francophones in Algeria, creating a tremendous cultural overlap. French remained the language of instruction in most schools and the language used in more than two-thirds of all newspapers and periodicals and on numerous television programs. Algeria and France share a cultural background that transcends diplomatic manoeuvres and has persisted throughout periods of "disenchantment" and strained relations. Over time, however, the arabization of Algeria and the increasing polarization of society between the francophone elite and the Arab masses have mobilized anti-French sentiment. Support for the arabization of Algerian society—including the elimination of French as the second national language and emphasis on an arabized education curriculum—and the recent success of the FIS indicate a growing fervor in Algeria for asserting an independent national identity. Such an identity emphasizes its Arab and Islamic cultural tradition rather than its French colonial past.  However, France's support for the military regime that assumed power in early 1992 indicates that the cooperative relations between the two countries remain strong.

In 2021, the French government determined to "drastically" reduce the number of visas issued to Algerian citizens (as well as Moroccans and Tunisians), arguing the lack of collaboration from those countries vis-à-vis deportations from France. 

On 2 October 2021, Algeria decided to recall its ambassador in France for consultations. The Algerian government was reportedly offended by some remarks made by French president Emmanuel Macron towards Algeria, described by Macron as ruled under a "political-military system" and as having an "official history" which had been "totally re-written". A day after, the French armed forces reported that Algeria had banned French military flights from using the Algerian airspace.

On 8 December 2021, in an unannounced trip to Algiers, Foreign Minister Jean-Yves Le Drian held talks with President Abdelmadjid Tebboune with the aim of opening a route towards renewed dialogue between the countries. On 29 January 2022, Tebboune held a telephone conversation with Macron to strengthen bilateral relations. Macron invited Tebboune to the 6th European Union - African Union Summit on 17 and 18 February in Brussels. In April 2022, Tebboune congratulated Macron on his re-election as French president and invited him to Algeria. In August 2022, Macron visited Algeria to further repair broken relations between the two countries.

Education

Currently there are two French international schools in Algiers:
 Lycée International Alexandre Dumas
 Petite École d’Hydra

Famous French-Algerians

DJ Snake
Zinedine Zidane
Albert Camus
Karim Benzema
Hélène Cixous
Jacques Derrida
Samir Nasri

Pieds-noirs
Raoul Salan

Resident diplomatic missions

of Algeria in France
 Paris (Embassy)
 Lille (Consulate-General)
 Lyon (Consulate-General)
 Marseilles (Consulate-General)
 Strasbourg (Consulate-General)
 Besançon (Consulate)
 Bobigny (Consulate)
 Bordeaux (Consulate)
 Créteil (Consulate)
 Grenoble (Consulate)
 Metz (Consulate)
 Montpellier (Consulate)
 Nanterre (Consulate)
 Nantes (Consulate)
 Nice (Consulate)
 Pontoise (Consulate)
 Saint-Étienne (Consulate)
 Toulouse (Consulate)

of France in Algeria
 Algiers (Embassy)
 Annaba (Consulate-General)
 Oran (Consulate-General)

See also
 List of Ambassadors of France to Algeria
 Francophone

References

Further reading
 Barclay, Fiona, ed. France's Colonial Legacies: Memory, Identity and Narrative   (University of Wales Press, 2013) 
 Bouchène, Abderrahmane et al. Histoire de l’Algérie à la Période Coloniale (Paris & Algiers: Editions La Découverte, 2012).
 Brower, Benjamin. A Desert Named Peace, The Violence of France’s Empire in the Algerian Sahara, 1844-1902 (Columbia UP, 2010).
 Choi, Sung. "French Algeria, 1830–1962." in The Routledge Handbook of the History of Settler Colonialism (2016): 201–14.
 Clancy-Smith, Julia, and Frances Gouda, eds. Domesticating the Empire: Race, Gender, and Family Life in French and Dutch Colonialism (U of Virginia Press, 1998).
 Clancy-Smith, Julia. Mediterraneans: North Africa and Europe in an Age of Migration, 1800-1900 (U of California Press, 2010).
 Clancy-Smith, Julia. Rebel and Saint: Muslim Notables, Populist Protest, Colonial Encounters (Algeria and Tunisia, 1800-1904) (U of California Press, 1994).
 Francis, Kyle. "Civilizing Settlers: Catholic Missionaries and the Colonial State in French Algeria, 1830-1914." (PhD dissertation, CUNY 2015) online with bibliography pp 236–248.
 Gallois, William. A History of Violence in the Early Algerian Colony (Palgrave MacMillan, 2013).
 Lorcin, Patricia. Imperial Identities: Stereotyping, Prejudice and Race in Colonial Algeria (I.B. Tauris, 1999).
 Murray-Miller, Gavin. “Imagining the Trans-Mediterranean Republic: Algeria, Republicanism, and the Ideological Origins of the French Imperial Nation-State, 1848-1870.” French Historical Studies 37#2 (Spring 2014): 303–330.
 Prochaska, David. Making Algeria French: Colonialism in Bône, 1870-1920 (Cambridge University Press, 1990).
 Ruedy, John. Modern Algeria: The Origins and Development of a Nation (Indiana University Press, 1992).
 Sessions, Jennifer E. Sword and Plow: France and the Conquest of Algeria (Cornell University Press  2017) ISBN number:9780801449758, ISBN number:9780801454479; illustrated 
 Sessions, Jennifer E. "Colonizing Revolutionary Politics: Algeria and the French Revolution of 1848." French Politics, Culture & Society 33.1 (2015): 75-100.

External links 

 Embassy of Algeria in Paris (in French)
 Embassy of France in Algiers (in French and Arabic)

 
Bilateral relations of France
France
Relations of colonizer and former colony